Frederick Edward Sadoff (October 21, 1926 – May 6, 1994) was an American film, stage and television actor.

Early years 
Sadoff was born in Brooklyn, New York to Henry and Bertha Sadoff; his older brothers Sidney and Robert were born years earlier.

Career 
Sadoff got his start as an actor on Broadway in the late 1940s, appearing in South Pacific in the role of 'Professor'. A life member of The Actors Studio, Sadoff also appeared in Camino Real and Wish You Were Here, among other Broadway productions. In 1956, he became personal assistant to Michael Redgrave, who starred in and directed a production of The Sleeping Prince, and also acted opposite him in the 1958 Audie Murphy film The Quiet American.

Sadoff moved to London to form a production company with Redgrave under the name F.E.S. Plays, Ltd., which presented works including The Importance of Being Oscar which had a short run on Broadway in 1961. While in England, he also worked as a director for the BBC and Rediffusion.

Eventually returning to the United States, he found success as an actor in The Poseidon Adventure in 1972 when he was cast as Linarcos, the company representative who ordered Captain Harrison (Leslie Nielsen) full ahead. He also acted in other films, including Papillon (1973), Cinderella Liberty (1973) and The Terminal Man (1974). On television, he appeared in guest roles on such series as Quincy, M.E., The Streets of San Francisco (in 9 episodes), Barney Miller (in 6 episodes), Barnaby Jones (in 3 episodes), The Rockford Files (in 2 episodes) and Buck Rogers in the 25th Century. He also acted in several soap operas, including Ryan's Hope, All My Children and Days of Our Lives.

Death 
Sadoff died of AIDS on May 6, 1994, in his home in Los Angeles, at age 67.

Filmography

References

External links
 
 
 
 A Personal Tribute to Fred Sadoff a fan site
 Grave of Frederick Sadoff

1926 births
1994 deaths
Male actors from New York City
American male film actors
American male musical theatre actors
American male soap opera actors
American male stage actors
American male television actors
AIDS-related deaths in California
Jewish American male actors
20th-century American male actors
20th-century American singers
People from Brooklyn
20th-century American male singers
20th-century American Jews